Viettesia plumicornis is a moth of the subfamily Arctiinae. It was described by Arthur Gardiner Butler in 1882. It is found on Madagascar.

References

Lithosiini
Moths described in 1882
Moths of Madagascar
Moths of Africa